An earthquake occurred on 26 August 2012 at 22:37 local time (Central Standard Time). No deaths were reported, however more than 40 people were injured when they were caught in a tsunami generated by the earthquake. Waves from the tsunami were unusually large for an earthquake of this size. The large waves were attributed to the earthquake's unique rupture characteristic. In addition to the absence of fatalities, damage caused by the earthquake and tsunami was minimal as a result of the sparse population around the affected region and the slow rupture characteristic of the event.

Tectonic setting
Off the west coast of Central America, including El Salvador and Nicaragua, lies a convergent plate margin where two tectonic plates collide. The Cocos Plate, made of oceanic crust moves northeast, towards the Caribbean Plate where Central America sits on continental crust. The two lithospheres meet at the Middle America Trench, where the Cocos Plate being denser, subducts under the Caribbean Plate. GPS data collected over a period of two decades showed that the Cocos Plate is moving towards Central America at a rate of /year. Seismic activity on the subduction zone has been responsible for large and tsunamigenic earthquakes caused by the rupture of the fault. Many large earthquakes including the  7.6 1992 Nicaragua earthquake are associated with rupture on the subduction zone.

Earthquake

The earthquake was associated with rupture on the subduction zone. The source region of this earthquake was the shallow section of the subduction zone. The rupture propagated with an estimated velocity of /s, which is unusually slow for most subduction zone earthquakes. In addition, the release of seismic energy occurred in long periods—a characteristic of tsunami earthquakes. The rate at which seismic energy was released in this event was at least 25 times smaller than earthquakes of similar magnitudes. However, with a rupture prolongation of 59 seconds, it was three times longer than usual. The rupture process of this event is reminiscent of the 1992 tsunami earthquake.

Given the earthquake released long-period seismic energy, shaking was relatively mild and in many parts of the coast, undetected by people present at the time. According to many residents living in San Salvador, the earthquake was not perceived at all, or that shaking was very weak, only reaching level II on the Mercalli intensity scale. Even at the coast, light shaking was reported by many residents for as long as three minutes. No damage was reported due to weak shaking.

Tsunami
In just ten minutes of the earthquake, the Pacific Tsunami Warning Center (PTWC) characterized the event as being a "slow earthquake". The PTWC issued the first bulletin material, a tsunami advisory, eight minutes after the event to the coasts of Central America. After receiving strong evidence that the event was a tsunami earthquake, they raised the advisory to a tsunami warning.

The slow rupture characteristic of the El Salvador earthquake meant that it was an efficient tsunami generator. Field surveys conducted in September 2012 along the coast of El Salvador and Nicaragua showed that the tsunami had a maximum height of over  along a 25 km stretch of coastline on the San Juan del Gozo Peninsula of Jiquilisco Bay, Usulután.

Many workers involved in conservation efforts were collecting sea turtle eggs along beaches at night when the tsunami struck. More than 40 people were injured, with at least three being serious and needing medical treatment.

An eyewitness at the beach during the time of the event recalled seeing three waves although researchers speculate that there was a confusion in distinguishing waves of a tsunami and those caused by wind.

Another survivor said three waves were seen, the first of which carried him hundreds of meters inland. After the tsunami, a local civil protection coordinator (who felt the earthquake for 20–30 seconds) arrived at the beach and described hearing gurgling noises, caused by water draining into sand. It took roughly 20 minutes for the tsunami water to retreat and completely drain.

Surveyors did not report same effects from the tsunami at Playa Costa del Sol, a beach resort ~10 km west of the peninsula. This was said at La Puntilla where many seafront houses and businesses are located. No distinguishable impacts were made as a result of the tsunami. In addition, many eyewitnesses from El Salvador were interviewed and they did not observe any tsunami activity. In Playa El Espino and Playa El Cuco, hotel workers and boat captains did not report any anomalies along the coast such as boats being moved significantly. A resident in El Retiro saw two people and a horse dragged down a nearby beach by the wave. Further surveys later showed evidence of tsunami inundation and overwash.

Other events
Just nine days after the earthquake, a magnitude 7.6 earthquake struck the Nicoya Peninsula in Costa Rica, killing two and injuring at least 20. This earthquake was located 450 km southeast of the August 27 earthquake, on the same subduction zone. It was preceded by a sequence of foreshocks that began after the August 27 event. Further research suggest the former event triggered an uptick in seismic activity on the Nicoya Peninsula section of the megathrust.

In November, the magnitude 7.4 Champerico earthquake off the west coast of Guatemala killed at least 48 people, left 100 missing and caused 155 injuries. The earthquake was considered typical for most similar-sized subduction earthquakes, only rupturing the fault interface at 15–35 km depth. It did not share the slow rupture characteristic like that seen in the August 27 event.

See also
List of earthquakes in 2012
List of earthquakes in El Salvador
List of earthquakes in Nicaragua

References

External links
El Salvador Tsunami, August 27, 2012 Main Event Page (NOAA)
El Salvador Tsunami, August 27, 2012 Local Impacts (NOAA)

2012 earthquakes
2012 tsunamis
2012 in El Salvador
Tsunami earthquakes
Earthquakes in El Salvador
Earthquakes in Nicaragua
2012 in Nicaragua